Montrose is a city in Lee County, Iowa. The population was 738 at the time of the 2020 census. The town is located on the Mississippi River. It is part of the Fort Madison–Keokuk, IA-IL-MO Micropolitan Statistical Area.

History

The area around Montrose has been occupied continuously since at least the 1780s, when Quashquame's village was established nearby. The area was strategically important because it is at the head of the Des Moines Rapids, a major impediment to river traffic that caused large boats to land in this area and transfer freight overland to avoid the rapids. Montrose was the location of Fort Des Moines No. 1, a military post from 1834 to 1837. From 1839 to 1846 Montrose was the home of many members of the Church of Jesus Christ of Latter Day Saints. This was especially true in 1839 when many people lived in an abandoned barracks at Montrose that served as a good short term residence while homes were being built in Nauvoo. Among Montrose's residents at this time were Brigham Young, Wilford Woodruff and Erastus Snow. Despite legends that the streets of Montrose were aligned to allow a direct view of the Nauvoo Temple across the Mississippi River in Illinois, the streets actually align with the 1834 layout of Fort Des Moines.

Geography
Montrose's longitude and latitude coordinatesin decimal form are 40.529532, -91.415995.

Demographics

2010 census
As of the census of 2010, there were 898 people, 359 households, and 242 families residing in the city. The racial makeup of the city was 98.2% White, 0.4% African American, 0.3% Asian, and 1.0% from two or more races. Hispanic or Latino of any race were 0.6% of the population.

There were 359 households, of which 26.2% had children under the age of 18 living with them, 51.8% were married couples living together, 10.6% had a female householder with no husband present, 5.0% had a male householder with no wife present, and 32.6% were non-families. 28.7% of all households were made up of individuals, and 13.9% had someone living alone who was 65 years of age or older. The average household size was 2.37 and the average family size was 2.86.

The median age in the city was 47.4 years. 18.5% of residents were under the age of 18; 7.2% were between the ages of 18 and 24; 21.2% were from 25 to 44; 32.6% were from 45 to 64; and 20.6% were 65 years of age or older. The gender makeup of the city was 48.9% male and 51.1% female.

2000 census
As of the census of 2000, there were 957 people, 374 households, and 255 families residing in the city. The racial makeup of the city was 97.81% White, 0.10% African American, 0.73% Native American, 0.10% Asian, 0.21% from other races, and 1.04% from two or more races. Hispanic or Latino of any race were 0.84% of the population.

There were 374 households, out of which 31.8% had children under the age of 18 living with them, 54.5% were married couples living together, 9.4% had a female householder with no husband present, and 31.8% were non-families. 29.9% of all households were made up of individuals, and 16.0% had someone living alone who was 65 years of age or older. The average household size was 2.44 and the average family size was 3.00.

In the city, the population was spread out, with 24.3% under the age of 18, 7.0% from 18 to 24, 25.3% from 25 to 44, 24.7% from 45 to 64, and 18.7% who were 65 years of age or older. The median age was 41 years. For every 100 females, there were 87.6 males. For every 100 females age 18 and over, there were 84.2 males.

The median income for a household in the city was $35,341, and the median income for a family was $40,865. Males had a median income of $30,855 versus $21,845 for females. The per capita income for the city was $17,010. About 7.0% of families and 8.9% of the population were below the poverty line, including 10.9% of those under age 18 and 6.8% of those age 65 or over.

Education
Montrose is served by Central Lee Community School District.

Notable people

Cal McVey, 19th century Major League Baseball player.
Margaret Warner Morley (1858–1923) educator, scholar and writer.
Cato Mead, the only known African American American Revolutionary War veteran buried west of the Mississippi River.
Nedra Volz (1908-2003) character actress 
Jerry R. Junkins, president, chairman, and CEO of Texas Instruments, Incorporated
Lowell Junkins, (1973 to 1985) Iowa State Senator, (1996–Present) Chairman of the Board at Federal Agricultural Mortgage Corporation

Buildings
St. Barnabas Episcopal Church (Montrose, Iowa)

References

External links

Welcome to Montrose, Iowa
City-Data Comprehensive statistical data and more about Montrose

Cities in Iowa
Iowa populated places on the Mississippi River
Cities in Lee County, Iowa
Fort Madison–Keokuk, IA-IL-MO Micropolitan Statistical Area